The MidAmerica Nazarene Pioneers football program is a college football team that represents MidAmerica Nazarene University in the Heart of America Athletic Conference, a part of the NAIA.  The team has had five head coaches since its first recorded football game in 1979.  The current coach is Jonathan Quinn who first took the position for the 2009 season.

Key

Coaches
Statistics correct as of the end of the 2011 college football season.

See also

 List of people from Olathe, Kansas

Notes

References

Lists of college football head coaches

Kansas sports-related lists